Eileen Helsby (born 30 June 1937) is a British actress with several television credits.

She appeared in the Doctor Who serial The Ark, 
Z-Cars, Doomwatch, Looking for Clancy, Survivors, Angels, Juliet Bravo and Bergerac.

External links
 
 Eileen Helsby at Theatricalia

1937 births
British television actresses
Living people
People from Blackpool
Actresses from Lancashire